Women Against Pit Closures was a political movement supporting miners and their families in the UK miners' strike of 1984–1985. The movement is credited with bringing feminist ideas into practice in an industrial dispute and empowering women to take a public role in a community with a male-dominated sphere.

Their group and support work grew from the communal feeding of families in April and May 1984 to a more explicitly political role. A multitude of local support groups were set up early on in the year-long strike.

An early event was a rally at the end of May 1984, held in Barnsley which was attended by 5000 women from coalfields across the country, from Scotland to Kent. This was followed by a conference in June and a large protest march in London on 11 August 1984. 23,000 working-class women attended that event, joined by other women trade unionists.

The name Women Against Pit Closures was adopted at a national delegate conference in Chesterfield in December 1984 and the group sought Associate Membership of the National Union of Mineworkers (NUM). The movement was influenced by contemporary women's peace movements like the women's camp at Greenham Common.

References

Miners' labor disputes
Socialist feminist organizations
Feminist organisations in the United Kingdom
1984 establishments in the United Kingdom
Organizations established in 1984
UK miners' strike (1984–1985)
Working-class feminism